Tamel may refer to:

 Tamel (Santa Leocádia), a parish in the municipality of Barcelos, Portugal
 Tamel (São Pedro Fins), a parish in the municipality of Barcelos, Portugal
 Tamel (São Veríssimo), a parish in the municipality of Barcelos, Portugal

See also
 Tamil